Liberty Township is one of eleven townships in Howard County, Indiana, United States. As of the 2010 census, its population was 4,862 and it contained 2,042 housing units. Liberty Township hosts the Howard County fair each year in July in Greentown, which is the second biggest town in Howard County, and third biggest in the Kokomo Metropolitan Area after only Kokomo, and Tipton.

History
Liberty Township was founded in 1858.

Geography

Cities and towns
 Greentown

Unincorporated towns
 Guy
 Plevna

Adjacent townships
 Harrison Township, Miami County (north)
 Jackson Township, Miami County (northeast)
 Jackson Township (east)
 Union Township (southeast)
 Taylor Township (southwest)
 Howard Township (west)
 Clay Township, Miami County (northwest)

Major highways

Cemeteries
The township contains five cemeteries: Freeman, Greenlawn, Hochstedler, Mast and Shrock.
Lamb Cemetery, Lindley Cemetery

Libraries
Greentown Main Public Library, in Eastern Junior & Senior High School
Greentown Children's Public Library, in Eastern Elementary School
Kokomo-Howard County Public Library Main Branch (in Kokomo, but serves Liberty Township outside of Greentown)
Kokomo-Howard County Public Library South Branch (in Kokomo, but serves Liberty Township outside of Greentown)

Schools
Eastern-Howard Elementary School
Eastern Junior & Senior High School

Business
Subway, in Greentown
Crave Crepes, in Greentown
Hucks Gas Station, in Greentown
Smart Mart/Citgo Gas, in Greentown
Family Dollar, in Greentown
Kellys Ice Cream, in Greentown
Walnut Street Bistro, in Greentown
Blondie's Cookies Headquarters, in Greentown
King Chef, in Greentown
Haley's II Family Dining, in Greentown
Ford, in Greentown
Bank, in Greentown

Medical
Ladd Dental, in Greentown
Greentown Animal Hospital, in Greentown
Century Villa, in Greentown

References
 
 United States Census Bureau cartographic boundary files

External links
 Indiana Township Association
 United Township Association of Indiana

Townships in Howard County, Indiana
Kokomo, Indiana metropolitan area
Townships in Indiana
1858 establishments in Indiana